The deputy premier of Tasmania is a role in the Government of Tasmania assigned to a responsible Minister in the Australian state of Tasmania. It has second ranking behind the premier of Tasmania in Cabinet, and its holder serves as acting premier during absence or incapacity of the premier. The deputy premier may either be appointed by the premier during the cabinet formation process, or may be elected by caucus. Due to the contingent role of the deputy premier, they almost without exception have additional ministerial portfolios. The current deputy premier is Michael Ferguson

List of deputy premiers of Tasmania
 Political parties

References
 

 
Tasmania
Tasmania-related lists
Ministers of the Tasmanian state government